R. Murugaiah Pandian is an Indian politician and  Member of the Legislative Assembly. He was elected to the Tamil Nadu legislative assembly as an Anna Dravida Munnetra Kazhagam candidate from Ambasamudram constituency in 1991 and 2016 elections. He served as chairman of Tamil Nadu Housing Board from 2011 to 2016.

References 

Now the MP for Tamil Nadu Housing board

All India Anna Dravida Munnetra Kazhagam politicians
Living people
Year of birth missing (living people)
Tamil Nadu MLAs 1991–1996
Tamil Nadu MLAs 2016–2021